Polystichum makinoi is a species of fern in the genus Polystichum in the family Dryopteridaceae. It is native to Bhutan, China, India, Japan, Nepal, Tibet, North Korea, South Korea, and Myanmar.

Description
Polystichum makinoi is an evergreen fern with triangular, glossy green leaves. It can reach up to 60 centimeters in height at maturity.

Etymology
Polystichum is derived from Greek and means 'many rows', which is a reference to the arrangement of the sori of ferns in this genus.

Makinoi is named for Tomitaro Makino (1863-1957), a Japanese botanist who was known as 'the father of Japanese botany'.

References

Flora of China
Flora of Tibet
Flora of Nepal
Flora of Myanmar
Flora of Korea
Flora of Japan
Flora of India (region)
Flora of Bhutan
makinoi